Autism's symptoms result from maturation-related changes in various systems of the brain. Although it is not well understood how autism occurs, there have been attempts to describe the mechanisms involved. Conceptually, one can divide its development into two areas: the pathophysiology of brain structures and processes associated with autism, and the neuropsychological linkages between brain structures and behaviors. The behaviors appear to have multiple pathophysiologies.

There is evidence that gut–brain axis abnormalities may be involved. A 2015 review proposed that immune dysregulation, gastrointestinal inflammation, malfunction of the autonomic nervous system, gut flora alterations, and food metabolites may cause brain neuroinflammation and dysfunction. A 2016 review concludes that enteric nervous system abnormalities might play a role in neurological disorders such as autism. Neural connections and the immune system are a pathway that may allow diseases originated in the intestine to spread to the brain.

Several lines of evidence point to synaptic dysfunction as a cause of autism. Some rare mutations may lead to autism by disrupting some synaptic pathways, such as those involved with cell adhesion. Gene replacement studies in mice suggest that autistic symptoms are closely related to later developmental steps that depend on activity in synapses and on activity-dependent changes. All known teratogens (agents that cause birth defects) related to the risk of autism appear to act during the first eight weeks from conception, and though this does not exclude the possibility that autism can be initiated or affected later, there is strong evidence that autism arises very early in development.

Pathophysiology

Unlike many other brain disorders, such as Parkinson's, autism does not have a clear unifying mechanism at either the molecular, cellular, or systems level; it is not known whether autism is a few disorders caused by mutations converging on a few common molecular pathways, or is (like intellectual disability) a large set of disorders with diverse mechanisms. Autism appears to result from developmental factors that affect many or all functional brain systems, and to disturb the timing of brain development more than the final product. Neuroanatomical studies and the associations with teratogens strongly suggest that autism's mechanism includes alteration of brain development soon after conception. This anomaly appears to start a cascade of pathological events in the brain that are significantly influenced by environmental factors. Just after birth, the brains of children with autism tend to grow faster than usual, followed by normal or relatively slower growth in childhood. It is not known whether early overgrowth occurs in all children with autism. It seems to be most prominent in brain areas underlying the development of higher cognitive specialization. Hypotheses for the cellular and molecular bases of pathological early overgrowth include the following:
 An excess of neurons that causes local overconnectivity in key brain regions.
 Disturbed neuronal migration during early gestation.
 Unbalanced excitatory–inhibitory networks.
 Abnormal formation of synapses and dendritic spines, for example, by modulation of the neurexin–neuroligin cell-adhesion system, or by poorly regulated synthesis of synaptic proteins. Disrupted synaptic development may also contribute to epilepsy, which may explain why the two conditions are associated.

The immune system is thought to play an important role in autism. Children with autism have been found by researchers to have inflammation of both the peripheral and central immune systems as indicated by increased levels of pro-inflammatory cytokines and significant activation of microglia. Biomarkers of abnormal immune function have also been associated with increased impairments in behaviors that are characteristic of the core features of autism such as, deficits in social interactions and communication. Interactions between the immune system and the nervous system begin early during the embryonic stage of life, and successful neurodevelopment depends on a balanced immune response. It is thought that activation of a pregnant mother's immune system such as from environmental toxicants or infection can contribute to causing autism through causing a disruption of brain development. This is supported by recent studies that have found that infection during pregnancy is associated with an increased risk of autism.

The relationship of neurochemicals to autism is not well understood; several have been investigated, with the most evidence for the role of serotonin and of genetic differences in its transport. The role of group I metabotropic glutamate receptors (mGluR) in the pathogenesis of fragile X syndrome, the most common identified genetic cause of autism, has led to interest in the possible implications for future autism research into this pathway. Some data suggests neuronal overgrowth potentially related to an increase in several growth hormones or to impaired regulation of growth factor receptors. Also, some inborn errors of metabolism are associated with autism, but probably account for less than 5% of cases.

The mirror neuron system (MNS) theory of autism hypothesizes that distortion in the development of the MNS interferes with imitation and leads to autism's core features of social impairment and communication difficulties. The MNS operates when an animal performs an action or observes another animal perform the same action. The MNS may contribute to an individual's understanding of other people by enabling the modeling of their behavior via embodied simulation of their actions, intentions, and emotions. Several studies have tested this hypothesis by demonstrating structural abnormalities in MNS regions of individuals with ASD, delay in the activation in the core circuit for imitation in individuals with ASD, and a correlation between reduced MNS activity and severity of the syndrome in children with ASD. However, individuals with autism also have abnormal brain activation in many circuits outside the MNS and the MNS theory does not explain the normal performance of children with autism on imitation tasks that involve a goal or object.

ASD-related patterns of low function and aberrant activation in the brain differ depending on whether the brain is doing social or nonsocial tasks.
In autism there is evidence for reduced functional connectivity of the default network (a large-scale brain network involved in social and emotional processing), with intact connectivity of the task-positive network (used in sustained attention and goal-directed thinking). In people with autism the two networks are not negatively correlated in time, suggesting an imbalance in toggling between the two networks, possibly reflecting a disturbance of self-referential thought.

The underconnectivity theory of autism hypothesizes that autism is marked by underfunctioning high-level neural connections and synchronization, along with an excess of low-level processes. Evidence for this theory has been found in functional neuroimaging studies on autistic individuals and by a brainwave study that suggested that adults with ASD have local overconnectivity in the cortex and weak functional connections between the frontal lobe and the rest of the cortex. Other evidence suggests the underconnectivity is mainly within each hemisphere of the cortex and that autism is a disorder of the association cortex.

From studies based on event-related potentials, transient changes to the brain's electrical activity in response to stimuli, there is considerable evidence for differences in autistic individuals with respect to attention, orientation to auditory and visual stimuli, novelty detection, language and face processing, and information storage; several studies have found a preference for nonsocial stimuli. For example, magnetoencephalography studies have found evidence in children with autism of delayed responses in the brain's processing of auditory signals.

In the genetic area, relations have been found between autism and schizophrenia based on duplications and deletions of chromosomes; research showed that schizophrenia and autism are significantly more common in combination with 1q21.1 deletion syndrome. Research on autism/schizophrenia relations for chromosome 15 (15q13.3), chromosome 16 (16p13.1) and chromosome 17 (17p12) are inconclusive.

Functional connectivity studies have found both hypo- and hyper-connectivity in brains of people with autism. Hypo-connectivity seems to dominate, especially for interhemispheric and cortico-cortical functional connectivity.

Neuropsychology
Two major categories of cognitive theories have been proposed about the links between autistic brains and behavior.

The first category focuses on deficits in social cognition. Simon Baron-Cohen's empathizing–systemizing theory postulates that autistic individuals can systemize—that is, they can develop internal rules of operation to handle events inside the brain—but are less effective at empathizing by handling events generated by other agents. An extension, the extreme male brain theory, hypothesizes that autism is an extreme case of the male brain, defined psychometrically as individuals in whom systemizing is better than empathizing. These theories are somewhat related to Baron-Cohen's earlier theory of mind approach, which hypothesizes that autistic behavior arises from an inability to ascribe mental states to oneself and others. The theory of mind hypothesis is supported by the atypical responses of children with autism to the Sally–Anne test for reasoning about others' motivations, and the mirror neuron system theory of autism described in Pathophysiology maps well to the hypothesis. However, most studies have found no evidence of impairment in autistic individuals' ability to understand other people's basic intentions or goals; instead, data suggests that impairments are found in understanding more complex social emotions or in considering others' viewpoints.

The second category focuses on nonsocial or general processing: the executive functions such as working memory, planning, inhibition. In his review, Kenworthy states that "the claim of executive dysfunction as a causal factor in autism is controversial", however, "it is clear that executive dysfunction plays a role in the social and cognitive deficits observed in individuals with autism". Tests of core executive processes such as eye movement tasks indicate improvement from late childhood to adolescence, but performance never reaches typical adult levels. A strength of the theory is predicting stereotyped behavior and narrow interests; two weaknesses are that executive function is hard to measure and that executive function deficits have not been found in young children with autism.

Weak central coherence theory hypothesizes that a limited ability to see the big picture underlies the central disturbance in autism. One strength of this theory is predicting special talents and peaks in performance in autistic people. A related theory—enhanced perceptual functioning—focuses more on the superiority of locally oriented and perceptual operations in autistic individuals. Yet another, monotropism, posits that autism stems from a different cognitive style, tending to focus attention (or processing resources) intensely, to the exclusion of other stimuli. These theories map well from the underconnectivity theory of autism.

Neither category is satisfactory on its own; social cognition theories poorly address autism's rigid and repetitive behaviors, while most of the nonsocial theories have difficulty explaining social impairment and communication difficulties. A combined theory based on multiple deficits may prove to be more useful.

References

Causes of autism
Autism
Autism
Autism